Carroll Kenneth Frost (born November 17, 1938, died January 26, 2021) was an American football defensive tackle in the National Football League for the Dallas Cowboys. He played college football at the University of Tennessee.

Early years
Frost attended Franklin High School, before accepting a football scholarship from the University of Tennessee. He was held out from the team as a sophomore. In 1960, his teammates voted him outstanding lineman.

In 1961, he was suspended after not meeting the school's academic requirements and left school before his college eligibility was over to join the NFL.

Professional career

Dallas Cowboys
Frost was signed as an undrafted free agent by the Dallas Cowboys after the 1961 NFL Draft, which at the time was seen as a coup, as his skills were being compared to those of first round draft choice Bob Lilly. Although he was a backup, he was named to the NFL All-rookie team.

He became a starter at defensive tackle in his second season, but suffered torn ligaments in his right knee during the third game against the Los Angeles Rams and was lost for the year. The injury would eventually end his career.

On May 13, 1963, he was traded to the Cleveland Browns in exchange for a third round draft choice (#39-Roger Pillath).

Cleveland Browns
Frost was waived by the Cleveland Browns on September 3, 1963.

Personal life
In 1963, he sued the Dallas Cowboys because of the medical treatment he received for his injured knee.

References

1938 births
2021 deaths
People from Franklin, Tennessee
Players of American football from Tennessee
American football defensive tackles
Tennessee Volunteers football players
Dallas Cowboys players